The Cristal Festival  is an international festival for professionals of the communication, advertising & creative worlds. Previously known as Méribel Ad Festival, it is now held every year in December, in the ski resort of Courchevel, French Alps). In 2014, the event will take place from 11 to 14 December.

Over 1000 people attend the festival every year coming for its debates, conferences, and workshops that are held about the latest topics, trends and developments in the industry, always led by keynote speakers.

Throughout the year, the Cristal Festival continues to provide networking and knowledge sharing through the Cristal Academies : National clubs (in France,
Spain, Russia and the UK), built around a shared sector (Media, Production...), specific subject (Women) or hobby (Golf).

The winners of this festival are included into ABC Show

History 
Originally taking place in Méribel, the Cristal Festival (formerly known as the Meribel Ad Festival, created in 2001) moved to Crans Montana in the Swiss Alps, in 2009.

Since 2004 the Festival has opened up to the world with an increasing number of participants and visitors. More than 1000 delegates attended the 2008 edition, with a large number of clients (160).
In 10 years, the Festival has become an important event for the communication world at the end of the year.

The ambition of the Festival is to promote advertising creativity, and to showcase a variety of work from the industry by means of a diverse range of creative competitions and through the sharing of knowledge. The competitions in December close the creative year and announce the broad tendencies of the coming international Prizes.

The Cristal Lab, created since the beginning, is the moment to get an overview of the latest trends and developments in the industry, and is a meeting place for the European and international specialists. It consists of debates, Keynote speaker conferences and workshops. The Cristal Lab is also a place used for business and creative exchanges.

Awards 
The Cristal Festival is a 5-day competition where creativity of the advertising world is rewarded & highlighted. A President of the Festival is appointed every year.

Here are some of the previous presidents: 
– 2010 : Mark Tutssel, Chief Creative Officer – Leo Burnett Worldwide
– 2009 : David Jones, Global CEO – Havas Worldwide
– 2007 : Howard Draft – Chairman & CEO – Draftfcb Worldwide
–       2006 : Kevin Roberts – CEO – Saatchi & Saatchi Worldwide

11 Prizes are awarded by several juries composed of advertising professionals and advertisers. Prizes are awarded to advertising agencies, producers and advertisers. They have to come from European countries.

Each of the following prizes includes a Cristal by product category, and a Grand Cristal, which does not take into account the category.

The Film and Radio Cristals.
In 2010 the Jury President of both prizes was Olivier Altmann, Chief Creative Officier at Publicis Worldwide

The International Production Cristal.
In 2010 the President of the jury was James Covill, Executive Producer at Grey London.

The Outdoor, Press and Print Craft Cristals.
In 2010 the Jury President was Paul Smith, Regional Creative Director EAME at Ogilvy & Mather

The Media Cristal awards the success of a media strategy.
In 2010, the Jury President was Mauricio Sabogal, Worldwide managing director at Initiative, and President at Mediabrands Latin America

The Integrated and Brand Content Cristals. In 2010, the jury president was Tom O’Keefe, Executive Creative Director at Draftfcb North America

The Consumer Marketing Cristal Prize involves different product categories, such as Client Loyalty, Marketing Action to Premium Client, and Technologic Innovation.
In 2010, the jury president was Daniel Morel, Chairman & CEO at Wunderman

The Digital & Mobile Cristal rewards creativity in online campaigns. Indeed, this prize rewards 25 categories such as Home Page Customization or Viral Film.
In 2010, the Jury President was Fernanda Romano, Global Creative Director of Digital & Experiential at Euro RSCG

Each year, several people have been awarded by the Cristal of Honor during the latest festival such as Bryan Buckley, director at Hungry Man USA, who is particularly known for creating Super Bowl classics.

References 

Festivals in Switzerland
Advertising awards